The 2002 ICF Canoe Slalom World Championships were held in Bourg St.-Maurice, France under the auspices of International Canoe Federation for the record-tying third time. It was the 27th edition. Bourg St.-Maurice hosted the championships previously in 1969 and 1987, and matches the times hosted by Spittal, Austria (1963, 1965, 1977) and Meran, Italy (1953, 1971, 1983). Beginning at these championships, this event would be held on an annual basis in non-Summer Olympic years. The 2001 championships were scheduled to take place in Ducktown, Tennessee (East of Chattanooga) in September that year on the canoe slalom course used for the 1996 Summer Olympics in neighboring Atlanta, but were cancelled in the wake of the September 11 attacks.

Medal summary

Men's

Canoe

Kayak

Women's

Kayak

Medal table

References
Official results
International Canoe Federation

Canoe Slalom World Championships
World Canoe Slalom Championships
ICF Canoe Slalom World Championships
International sports competitions hosted by France
Canoeing and kayaking competitions in France